Chester Augustus Blanchard (July 13, 1903 – November 13, 1996) was an American baseball third baseman in the Negro leagues. He played with the Dayton Marcos in 1926 and the Cleveland Tigers in 1928.

References

External links
 and Seamheads

Cleveland Tigers (baseball) players
Dayton Marcos players
1903 births
1996 deaths
Baseball players from Ohio
Baseball third basemen
20th-century African-American sportspeople